Avoca Township may refer to the following townships in the United States:

 Avoca Township, Livingston County, Illinois
 Avoca Township, Pottawatomie County, Oklahoma